Soldiers of Egypt or Ajnad Misr is a Salafist Islamist militant group that has been operating near Cairo, Egypt. The group was founded by Humam Muhammed in 2013, after he split away from the Ansar Bait al-Maqdis militant group. The group claims that its attacks are "retribution" for the August 2013 Rabaa Massacre; notably, the group targets only security forces. It has warned civilians of the presence of bombs that it has placed. The Cairo Court for Urgent Matters declared the group a terrorist group on 22 May 2014. It has been a Proscribed Organisation in the United Kingdom under the Terrorism Act 2000 since 28 November 2014. The United States Department of State designated it a terrorist organization on 18 December 2014.

Attacks
 The group claimed responsibility for an attack that occurred on 24 January 2014 that ultimately killed two policeman, Ansar Bait al-Maqdis indicated that Soldiers of Egypt had executed one of the bombings, despite the fact that Ansar Bait al-Maqdis initially claimed responsibility for all of the bombings.
 The group claimed responsibility for two bombings that occurred on 7 February 2014.
 The group claimed to have killed one policemen and injured eight people in a 13 February 2015 bombing near a police station in Ain Shams. 
 The group exploded a bomb in 6th of October City on 5 March 2014.
 The group targeted a police car parked near the Israeli embassy in Cairo on 11 March 2014. 
 The group placed a bomb in Nasr City on 29 March 2014.
 One police general was killed on 2 April 2014.
 One traffic policeman was wounded by a bomb on 10 April 2014.
 Two policemen and a civilian wounded by a bomb on 15 April 2014.
 One police officer was killed by the group in Mohandessin on 18 April 2014.
 The group killed one member of the Central Security Forces in Cairo on 23 April 2014.
 The group killed two policemen in Cairo on 30 June 2014.
 The group killed two policemen in Cairo on 20 September 2014.
 The group claimed responsibility for a bombing that occurred on 22 October 2014 near Cairo University that injured 11 people.
 The group claimed responsibility for a bombing that occurred on 20 November 2014 near Helwan University that injured at least five police officers.
 The group injured four policemen in a bombing that occurred on 5 December 2014 near Ain Shams University.
 The group killed one policeman and injured three civilians in a January 2015 bombing in the Talbia district of Giza.
 The group killed one policeman and injured seven policemen and a civilian in a 13 February 2015 bombing in Cairo. 
 The group claimed to have killed four policemen and injured eight people in a 28 March 2015 bombing near Cairo University.
 The group claimed responsibility for a bombing in Zamalek that occurred on 6 April 2015 that killed one policeman.

References

Jihadist groups in Egypt
Organisations of the Egyptian Crisis (2011–2014)
Organizations designated as terrorist by the United States
Organizations based in Africa designated as terrorist
Organizations based in Asia designated as terrorist
Organisations designated as terrorist by the United Kingdom
Organizations designated as terrorist by Egypt